Iakubali Shikhdzamalovich Shikhdzamalov (born 6 June 1991), also known as Yakub Shikhghamalov, is a Russian freestyle wrestler.  He is Russian Nationals Junior Runner-up. National Master of Sports in Freestyle Wrestling. Iakubali Shikhdzamalov competed at the World Freestyle Wrestling Cup 2015 in Los Angeles, California, United States. In Russian Freestyle Wrestling Championships 2015 he defeated Jordan Burroughs killer - Denis Tsargush 6–2.

Championships and accomplishments
2008 Russian Junior Nationals 3rd – 60 kg
2009 Russian Junior Nationals Runner-up – 60 kg
2013 Intercontinental Cup 13th – 74 kg
2014 Russian Nationals Freestyle Wrestling Runner-up – 74 kg
2014 Hero of the Russian Federation Magomed Omarov Cup Winner – 74 kg
2015 Golden Grand Prix Ivan Yarygin 2015 12th – 74 kg
2015 World Freestyle Wrestling Cup 2015 – 4th place (Los Angeles, California, USA)
2015 Russian National Freestyle Wrestling Championships 2015 5th place – 74 kg (Kaspiysk, Dagestan)
2015 European Nations Cup 2015 (Moscow Lights-Alrosa Cup) – 74 kg (Moscow, Russia)

References

Living people
Sportspeople from Makhachkala
1991 births
Russian male sport wrestlers